Fists of Legend is a 2013 South Korean sports drama film directed by Kang Woo-suk. It is based on the popular webtoon of the same title written by Lee Jong-gyu and illustrated by Lee Yoon-gyun. The film stars Hwang Jung-min, Yoo Jun-sang, Yoon Je-moon, Lee Yo-won, and Jung Woong-in.

Plot
A moment of bad luck derailed Deok-kyu's Olympic dreams and led him and his friends to jail. Jin-ho got out of jail quickly because of his rich parents, but Deok-kyu, Jae-seok, and Sang-hoon were not so lucky.

Years later, while running a noodle shop to earn extra money following an accident involving his daughter, Deok-kyu accepts an invitation to join a televised mixed martial arts tournament, Fists of Legend. Among the contestants are Deok-kyu's old friends Sang-hoon, currently a manager at a large company who lacks in self-respect after getting passed over for a promotion, and Jae-seok, now a good-for-nothing guy who dreams of becoming a somebody.

Cast
 Hwang Jung-min - Im Deok-kyu 
 Park Jung-min young Deok-kyu
 Yoo Jun-sang- Lee Sang-hoon
 Gu Won - young Sang-hoon
 Yoon Je-moon - Shin Jae-seok
 Park Doo-shik - young Jae-seok
 Lee Yo-won - Hong Gyu-min
 Jung Woong-in - Son Jin-ho
 Lee Jung-hyuk - young Jin-ho
 Sung Ji-ru - Seo Kang-gook
 Ji Woo - Im Soo-bin
 Kang Shin-il - Director Jo
 Kang Sung-jin - announcer
 Kwon Hyun-sang - Author
 Choi Hyo-eun - Eun-soo
 Kwon Eun-soo - Writer Kwon
 Kim Jae-yong - Writer Jae

Production
Filming began on July 15, 2012 at the Shin Joon-sub boxing gym in Namwon, North Jeolla Province, and wrapped on November 28, 2012 in Paju.

Actor Yoo Jun-sang injured the cruciate ligament in his left knee while filming and underwent surgery on October 30, 2012.

Awards and nominations
2013 50th Grand Bell Awards
Nomination - Best Actor - Hwang Jung-min
Nomination - Best Supporting Actor - Yoo Jun-sang
Nomination - Best New Actor - Park Doo-shik
Nomination - Best New Actor - Park Jung-min
Nomination - Best Lighting - Kang Dae-hee

References

External links 
  
 
 

2013 films
2010s sports drama films
South Korean sports drama films
Martial arts tournament films
Mixed martial arts films
South Korean high school films
Films about television
Films based on South Korean webtoons
Films directed by Kang Woo-suk
Cinema Service films
CJ Entertainment films
2010s Korean-language films
Live-action films based on comics
2010s high school films
2013 drama films
2010s South Korean films